James Kyle Cochrane  (born 14 January 1954) is a Scottish former professional footballer who made 242 appearances in the English Football League playing for Middlesbrough, Darlington, and Torquay United. Born in Glasgow, he began his football career with Drumchapel Amateurs, and after leaving Torquay, he played non-League football for Blyth Spartans.

Cochrane later became a solicitor.

References

1954 births
Living people
Footballers from Glasgow
Scottish footballers
Association football fullbacks
Drumchapel Amateur F.C. players
Middlesbrough F.C. players
Darlington F.C. players
Torquay United F.C. players
Blyth Spartans A.F.C. players
English Football League players